Ernst Wilhelm Engelhardt Ritter Seidler von Feuchtenegg (5 June 1862, Schwechat, Lower Austria – 23 January 1931, Vienna) was an Austrian statesman.  He served as Minister-President of Austria from 1917 until 1918.  His daughter was the actress Alma Seidler.

References

 Ottův slovník naučný nové doby 

1862 births
1931 deaths
20th-century Ministers-President of Austria
People from Schwechat
Ministers-President of Austria
Austrian knights
Academic staff of the University of Vienna